Saurom (formerly Saurom Lamderth) is a Spanish folk metal band based in the city of San Fernando, Cádiz. Its lyrics are often about traditional legends and poems. Some of their songs deal with fantastic literature's stories, like The Lord of the Rings or  A Song of Ice and Fire.

Discography

Demos 
 La cripta del duende (1996)
 Regreso a las Tierras Medias (1997)
 Legado de juglares (1999)
 Orígenes (2000)

Studio albums 
 El guardián de las melodías perdidas (2001)
 Sombras del Este (2002)
 Legado de juglares (2004)
 Sinfonías de los bosques (2006)
 JuglarMetal (2006)
 Once romances desde al-Ándalus (2008)
 Romances from al-Ándalus (2008)
 Maryam (2010)
 Vida  (2012)
 Sueños (2015)
 La Magia de la Luna (2017)
Música (2020)

References

External links 

Celtic metal musical groups
Folk metal musical groups
Spanish heavy metal musical groups
Spanish power metal musical groups